is a passenger railway station located in the city of Komae, Tokyo, Japan, operated by the private railway operator Odakyu Electric Railway.

Lines

Station layout
The elevated station has two side platforms and four tracks. The two outermost tracks are the local tracks allowing local trains to stop at the station. There are two additional inner tracks to allow express trains to bypass the station. The station's building is located underneath the station. The space under the train tracks on either side of the concourse is occupied by commercial facilities and a bicycle parking area.

History
Komae Station was opened on 27 May 1927. The station was not included in the initial construction plans for the Odakyu railway line, but local residents successfully campaigned for a station to be built in this neighbourhood.

Throughout the 1990s it was extensively redeveloped as part of the Odakyu Line's track doubling project. Previous to the redevelopment, the platforms were on ground level and linked by an overhead bridge.

Station numbering was introduced in January 2014 with Komae being assigned station number OH16.

Passenger statistics
In fiscal 2019, the station had an average of 48,921 passengers daily.

Surroundings
The station is surrounded by a suburban commercial district, including a small shopping centre built under the train tracks. Komae City Hall lies to the north of the station.

See also
List of railway stations in Japan

References

External links

 Odakyu station information 

Odakyu Odawara Line
Stations of Odakyu Electric Railway
Railway stations in Tokyo
Railway stations in Japan opened in 1927
Komae, Tokyo